Cyril Henry Spiers (4 April 1902 – 21 May 1967) was an English association football goalkeeper who played for Aston Villa, Tottenham Hotspur and Wolverhampton Wanderers. He later went on to manage at Football League clubs for more than twenty years.

Playing career

Spiers began his playing career at Halesowen Town during World War I and signed for Aston Villa in 1920, where he made 104 League and 8 FA Cup appearances over a seven-year career, competing with Tommy Jackson for a regular place. He made his debut on Christmas Day 1920, in a 4–3 defeat to Manchester United. He was forced to retire after suffering a serious injury and, believing that he could never play again,  Aston Villa released him. However, he underwent experimental surgery and was able to return to football with Tottenham Hotspur, making 169 appearances between 1927 and 1932. Spiers was ever present in seasons 1929–30 and 1930–31 but missed the entire 1932–33 season through injury. He eventually left the club and became player-coach, and subsequently, assistant manager, to Frank Buckley at Wolverhampton Wanderers. He made eight appearances for "Wolves".

Managerial career

In 1939 he took over as secretary-manager at Cardiff City but his rebuilding of the team was cut short following the outbreak of World War II. He stayed at the club throughout the war and set up a number of nursery teams, including Cardiff Nomads who would go on to bring local football talent, including Alan Harrington and Colin Baker, to the club. He fell into dispute with the club over money and left to manage Norwich City in June 1946. He was back at Cardiff in December 1947 as manager to replace Billy McCandless, bringing the Cardiff Nomads back with him having adopted the club for Norwich when he joined. He took them to promotion during the 1951–52 season but eventually left to manage Crystal Palace in September 1954. He later had a spell scouting for Leicester City before taking his last managerial post at Exeter City in 1962.

Spiers died on 21 May 1967 aged 65.

Managerial statistics

References
Specific

General

External links

1902 births
1967 deaths
Footballers from Birmingham, West Midlands
English footballers
Aston Villa F.C. players
Tottenham Hotspur F.C. players
Norwich City F.C. managers
Cardiff City F.C. managers
Exeter City F.C. managers
Crystal Palace F.C. managers
English football managers
Association football goalkeepers
English Football League players
English Football League representative players
Wolverhampton Wanderers F.C. players
Wolverhampton Wanderers F.C. non-playing staff